The 2016 Paris Sevens was the ninth tournament of the 2015–16 World Rugby Sevens Series. The tournament was played on 13–15 May 2016 at Stade Jean Bouin in Paris, France. It was the first time that the France Sevens had been featured on the Sevens world circuit since 2006.

Format
Sixteen teams are drawn into four pools of four teams each. Each team plays each of the other teams their pool once. The top two teams from each pool advance to the Cup/Plate brackets. The bottom two teams from each group go to the Bowl/Shield brackets.

Teams
The 16 participating teams for the tournament:

Pool stages

Pool A

Pool B

Pool C

Pool D

Knockout stage

Shield

Bowl

Plate

Cup

External links
Official Site

France Sevens
2015–16 World Rugby Sevens Series
2015–16 in French rugby union